County Tipperary was a constituency represented in the Irish House of Commons until its abolition on 1 January 1801.

Members of Parliament
 1560: Patrick Sherlock and Oliver Grace
 1585: Redmond Everard and James Butler 
 1613–1615 Sir John Everard and Walter Butler (inherited peerage in 1614 and replaced by John Tobyn)
 1634–1635 Thomas Butler and Tibbett Purcell
 1661–1666 Thomas Sadlier and Bartholomew Fowke

1689–1801

Notes

References

 

Constituencies of the Parliament of Ireland (pre-1801)
Historic constituencies in County Tipperary
1800 disestablishments in Ireland
Constituencies disestablished in 1800